Yelnikovsky District (Jeĺnikoń ajmak; , Kuzbuje) is an administrative and municipal district (raion), one of the twenty-two in the Republic of Mordovia, Russia. It is located in the north of the republic. Its administrative center is the rural locality (a selo) of Yelniki. As of the 2010 Census, the total population of the district was 11,995, with the population of Yelniki accounting for 49.2% of that number.

Administrative and municipal status
Within the framework of administrative divisions, Yelnikovsky District is one of the twenty-two in the republic. The district is divided into thirteen selsoviets which comprise sixty-seven rural localities. As a municipal division, the district is incorporated as Yelnikovsky Municipal District. Its sixteen selsoviets are incorporated into sixteen rural settlements within the municipal district. The selo of Yelniki serves as the administrative center of both the administrative and municipal district.

References

Notes

Sources



 
Districts of Mordovia